Chrysichthys depressus is a species of catfish endemic to the Democratic Republic of the Congo where it is only found near Boma.  It was formerly known as Gnathobagrus depressus.

Distribution

The fish is found in Africa and is only known from the type locality at Boma (lower Congo River basin), in the Democratic Republic of the Congo

Size

References

 

Claroteidae
Catfish genera
Freshwater fish genera
Fish of Africa
Endemic fauna of the Democratic Republic of the Congo
Fish described in 1917
Taxa named by John Treadwell Nichols
Taxa named by Ludlow Griscom